On October 30, 2019, WhatsApp's parent company Facebook, Inc. confirmed that Pegasus, a sophisticated snooping software developed by Israel's NSO Group, was used to target Indian journalists, activists, lawyers and senior government officials. The journalists and activists are believed to have been targets of surveillance for a two-week period until May, when the Indian national election was held.

The snooping scandal came out after WhatsApp filed a case in California's Northern District federal court against the NSO group, alleging the NSO group had developed the software used to infect 1,400 target devices with malware.

The IT Ministry of India sought a detailed response from WhatsApp on the issue. They responded that they had alerted the government on two occasions—once in May and for the second time in September 2019. In response to Indian Government's order, WhatsApp informed the Computer Emergency Response Team of India in May and September that Pegasus spyware affected Indian WhatsApp users.

Indian National Congress party alleged that the Narendra Modi-led government has been caught snooping on journalists, activists, lawyers and senior government officials. They later alleged that their leaders, including general secretary Priyanka Gandhi, are also being targeted by this. They also claimed WhatsApp sent messages to different people whose phones were hacked. One such message was also received from the WhatsApp of Priyanka Gandhi a few months ago.

Former Chief Financial officer of Infosys Mr. T.V. Mohandas Pai also demanded government to probe on the scandal and to come out with a report before the public.

See also 

 Pegasus Project (investigation)
 Pegasus Project revelations in India

References

Further reading
 Israeli Firm Used Flaw In WhatsApp for Spying, The New York times, 14 May 2019. 
 Nicole Perlroth, WhatsApp Says Israeli Firm Used Its App in Spy Program, The New York Times, 29 October 2019, 
 Craig Timberg, Jay Greene, "WhatsApp accuses Israeli firm of helping hack phones", The Washington Post, 30 October 2019. 
 Mehul Srivastava, Tom Wilson, "Inside the WhatsApp hack", Financial Times, 30 October 2019. 
 Stephanie Kirchgaessner, NSO Group points finger at state clients in WhatsApp spying case, The Guardian, 7 April 2020. 
 Tara Seals, Facebook's NSO Group Lawsuit Over WhatsApp Spying Set to Proceed, Newstex (blog), 20 July 2020. 
 Shannon Vavra, "Israeli Spyware Firm NSO Group Could Soon Be Spilling Its Secrets", The Daily Beast, 9 November 2021. 

WhatsApp
Political campaign techniques
Data breaches
Political scandals in India
Cybercrime in India